Grądzkie may refer to the following places:
Grądzkie, Masovian Voivodeship (east-central Poland)
Grądzkie, Warmian-Masurian Voivodeship (north Poland)
Grądzkie, West Pomeranian Voivodeship (north-west Poland)